Alsinidendron obovatum is a species of flowering plant in the family Caryophyllaceae. It is endemic to lowland moist forests in Hawaii. It is threatened by habitat loss.

References

Caryophyllaceae
Endemic flora of Hawaii
Critically endangered plants
Taxonomy articles created by Polbot